Stülpner-Legende is an East German television series.

See also
List of German television series

External links
 

1973 German television series debuts
1973 German television series endings
Television series set in the 18th century
German-language television shows
Television in East Germany